The Constitution Alteration (Essential Services) Bill 1926, was an unsuccessful referendum held in 1926 that sought to alter the Australian Constitution to give the Commonwealth legislative power to protect the public from any actual or probable interruption of essential services.

Question
Do you approve of the proposed law for the alteration of the Constitution entitled 'Constitution Alteration (Essential Services) 1926'?
The proposal was to alter section 51 of the Constitution as follows:

Section fifty-one of the Constitution is altered by inserting after paragraph (v.) the following paragraph :—
(v.) a. Protecting the interests of the public in case of actual or probable interruption of any essential service.

Results
The referendum was not approved by a majority of voters, and a majority of the voters was achieved in only two states, New South Wales and Queensland.Question: Do you approve of the proposed law for the alteration of the Constitution entitled 'Constitution Alteration (Essential Services) 1926'?

References

Referendum (Essential Services)
1926 referendums
1926 (Essential Services)